Mean Girls is a coming-of-age stage musical with music by Jeff Richmond, lyrics by Nell Benjamin, and a book by Tina Fey. It is based on the 2004 film of the same name also written by Fey, which was in turn based on the 2002 nonfiction book Queen Bees and Wannabes by Rosalind Wiseman. The musical premiered at the National Theatre, Washington, D.C., in October 2017 and opened on Broadway in April 2018 at the August Wilson Theatre. Due to the COVID-19 pandemic, the show played its final performance on Broadway on March 11, 2020.

A film adaptation of the musical is in development and will be released on Paramount+.

Background
A musical adaptation of the 2004 film Mean Girls was in the works by 2013. News emerged on October 3, 2016—the day of the year fans dub "Mean Girls Day," in reference to a line in the movie—that the musical would have its world premiere in Washington, D.C. in the fall of 2017. On December 30, 2016, producers confirmed that the musical would make its premiere at the National Theatre in October 2017.

Productions

Broadway
The musical made its world premiere at the National Theatre in Washington, D.C. on October 31, 2017, and ran through December 3, 2017. Mean Girls began previews on Broadway at the August Wilson Theatre on March 12, 2018, before opening officially on April 8, 2018. Casey Nicholaw was the director of the show and its choreographer, and the musical is produced by Lorne Michaels and Stuart Thompson. The musical has costumes by Gregg Barnes, scenic design by Scott Pask, video design by Finn Ross and Adam Young, lighting by Kenneth Posner and sound by Brian Ronan.<ref>[https://www.ibdb.com/broadway-production/mean-girls-515822#opennightcredit Mean Girls – Broadway Musical – Original  "Mean Girls' Credits"] ibdb.com, Retrieved May 12, 2018,</ref> It was announced on January 23, 2020, that the Broadway production has recouped its capitalization. Due to the COVID-19 pandemic, which forced theatres across the nation to close, the show halted performances on March 11, 2020, when Broadway shut down; it was later announced on January 7, 2021, that Mean Girls had closed permanently after 833 performances.

U.S. National Tour
The U.S. national tour began in Buffalo, New York, at Shea's Performing Arts Center, on September 21, 2019. Mary Kate Morrissey plays Janis Sarkisian, with Danielle Wade as Cady Heron, Mariah Rose Faith as Regina George, Megan Masako Haley as Gretchen Wieners, Jonalyn Saxer as Karen Smith, Eric Huffman as Damian Hubbard, Adante Carter as Aaron Samuels, and Kabir Bery as Kevin Gnapoor.

 Film 

On January 23, 2020, Fey announced that a film adaptation of the musical was being produced. 

In December 2022, Angourie Rice, Reneé Rapp, Auli’i Cravalho, and Jaquel Spivey were cast in the roles of Cady, Regina, Janis, and Damian, respectively.  The film will be produced by Broadway Video and Little Stranger. Arturo Perez and Samantha Jayne will direct with Fey writing the film. Paramount Pictures will release the film on Paramount+. In February 2023, it was announced that the roles of Karen, Aaron, and Gretchen would be played by Avantika, Christopher Briney, and Bebe Wood, respectively. Fey and Tim Meadows will reprise their roles as Ms. Norbury and Principal Duvall from the 2004 film, while Jenna Fischer and Busy Philipps are set to play Mrs. Heron and Mrs. George. Ashley Park, who played Gretchen in the original Broadway production, is set to make a cameo in the film.

Principal photography began on March 7, 2023.

 West End 
As of early January 2020, producers were in final talks of a West End production, and the show was expected to open in the late spring of 2021. Production was later brought to a halt due to the COVID-19 pandemic, but in January 2021 producer Lorne Michaels said "We remain excited to bring this musical to the big screen, relaunch the tour and prepare for a London production."

Synopsis
Act One

Janis Sarkisian and Damian Hubbard introduce the audience to Cady Heron, breaking the fourth wall and inviting them on their journey ("A Cautionary Tale"). Cady and her parents have moved to a Chicago suburb from Kenya, Africa but Cady soon realizes that her high school classmates do not readily accept others who differ from them. Despite this, she is ready to accept the challenge of fitting in at the high school ("It Roars"), only for Cady to find that no one seems to like her or even acknowledge her ("It Roars (Reprise)"). Janis and Damian decide to help her as she tries to find her social group ("Where Do You Belong?"); describing the clique of high school social royalty dubbed "the Plastics" in particular. The trio consists of Regina George, the "Queen Bee"; Gretchen Wieners, Regina's nervous, eager-to-please second-in-command; and Karen Smith, the stereotypical dumb blonde. Regina and her fellow Plastics decide that the new girl will eat lunch with them for the rest of the week ("Meet the Plastics"). When Cady tells Damian and Janis about the invitation, the latter asks her to say yes to the Plastics and tell them everything they say. Damian tries to explain why they hate Regina, but Janis interrupts him.

In AP Calculus, Cady meets the dreamy Aaron Samuels and immediately falls for him ("Stupid with Love"). Kevin, head of the Mathletes, is impressed with Cady's performance in class and asks her to join them, but Gretchen warns Cady that joining the Mathletes is social suicide and Regina puts down Kevin to make him leave. Cady thinks Regina is nice for "protecting" her, but Janis warns her that Regina is dangerous. Amazed and intoxicated by her newfound power, however, Cady does not pay attention to Janis’s words ("Apex Predator"). At the mall, Gretchen asks Cady if she has met any boys she likes. When Cady tells her about Aaron, Gretchen becomes horrified because he is Regina's ex-boyfriend, which makes him off-limits to her friends. The Plastics and Cady retire to Regina's house, where they meet her "cool mom" and Gretchen and Karen show Cady their old Burn Book, where they put photos of their classmates and write mean comments about them. When they come across Janis' photo in the book, Gretchen explains that she and Regina used to be best friends. Regina claims Janis freaked out when she was unable to invite her to her thirteenth birthday party and ended up in art therapy. Later, Gretchen confides in Cady that, because of the state of her friendship with Regina, she has lost all confidence in herself ("What's Wrong With Me?").

The next day, Aaron discusses his previous relationship with Regina, how she made him feel like he was not himself, and that he has sworn off of dating. After an awkwardly concealed verbal slip-up results in him explaining a math problem to her, Cady believes that if she acts stupid, Aaron will help her with her work, and therefore talk to her more ("Stupid with Love (Reprise)"). After using this tactic, Aaron invites Cady to his Halloween party. Karen explains that in high school, Halloween revolves around looking sexy and having a hot costume ("Sexy"). Cady fails to realize this and shows up at the party in a "scary" costume, embarrassing herself. Later at the party, Gretchen tells Regina about Cady's crush on Aaron to get her approval. Spitefully, Regina decides to flirt with and manipulate Aaron until he agrees to get back together with her ("Someone Gets Hurt"). Cady sees Aaron kissing Regina and is devastated.

Furious, Cady shows up at Damian's house and tells him and Janis what happened. Damian tells Cady that the real reason Regina and Janis stopped being friends was that in 6th grade, Regina accused Janis of being a lesbian. When the latter was unable to deny it, her classmates bullied her until she left school. The three friends decide to work together to get revenge on Regina, starting with giving her Kälteen Bars to make her gain weight. They also trick Gretchen by sending a fake Candy Cane Gram to Cady from "Regina" saying that they are now best friends. This leads Gretchen to reveal Regina's secret hook-ups with football player Shane Oman, among other vengeful acts ("Revenge Party"). After the Plastics' disastrous "Rockin' Around the Pole" dance at the school talent show, people start noticing Regina's weight gain. Later, when she breaks one of the Plastics' arbitrary clothing rules, Cady stands up to her; banning her from sitting at their table. Everyone is relieved to be freed from Regina's rule ("Fearless"). Cady tries to apologize to Regina for kicking her out, but she insinuates that her reign is far from over ("Someone Gets Hurt (Reprise)").

Act Two

Following the winter break, Cady has undergone a complete makeover befitting of her new "Queen Bee" status leading Karen and Gretchen ("A Cautionary Tale (Reprise)"), though Damian and Janis disapprove of this. After Cady tells Janis that she cannot attend her art show because of a trip with her parents, Damian and the other girls of North Shore High School try to hamper Cady's ever-growing social obsessions and make her stop acting dumb for Aaron by telling her about their own negative past experiences with obsessive behavior ("Stop"). Gretchen and Karen convince Cady to lie to her parents and throw a "small" party while they are gone that weekend. Gretchen starts to notice similarities between her friendship with Regina and Cady while Mrs. George wonders why her daughter refuses to confide in her; reminiscing about the old days when Regina was a child. Concurrently, Gretchen contemplates being friends with Cady ("What's Wrong With Me? (Reprise)").

Following Gretchen and Karen's advice, Cady throws a party in an attempt to get Aaron to come over. However, she becomes intoxicated and crazier ("Whose House is This?"). When Aaron shows up, they sneak off to her bedroom, where Cady tells him the "funny" story about how she pretended that she was dumb to make him like her. Aaron becomes upset and says he liked the smart and kind Cady, not her new Plastic self ("More is Better"). He leaves, but she chases after him and runs into Janis and Damian outside, who have come to confront her after the art show. They tell Cady that she betrayed their trust, lied to them, and has gone full Plastic. Cady accuses Janis of being in love with her, just as Regina did years ago. Janis and Damian are disgusted by Cady's behavior, with the former throwing a picture she submitted to her art show at Cady; revealing that the winning painting was of the three of them ("Someone Gets Hurt (Reprise 2)").

When Regina discovers that she was not invited to Cady's party and that the Kälteen Bars were the cause of her weight gain, she decides to get revenge by releasing the Burn Book after adding "Regina is a Fugly Cow" to it in order to take the blame off of herself. She throws copies of the Burn Book pages all over the school, revealing the insults about everyone they know, except Karen, Gretchen, and Cady ("World Burn"). All of the junior class girls begin fighting over the insults. Janis and Damian see an insult in the book that only Cady could have written about him. At a required assembly about the Burn Book, Ms. Norbury tries to bring the girls together. Janis explains her philosophy to the school, referencing her failed friendships with both Cady and Regina; empowering the girls to stand up for themselves ("I'd Rather Be Me"). When Regina storms out in anger and disbelief, Cady tries to apologize, but Regina gets distracted and hit by a passing school bus.

The accident prompts Cady to reevaluate herself and realize what a monster she has become. After learning Ms. Norbury was about to be fired due to the things she wrote, Cady takes full blame for the Burn Book, despite not having written the entire thing herself. She is suspended for three weeks and banned from the Spring Fling ("Fearless (Reprise)"). When Cady returns to school, Ms. Norbury offers her a way to earn extra credit and save her grade: joining the Mathletes at the state championships. The team wins, and Cady feels redeemed ("Do This Thing"). She then sneaks into the Spring Fling with Aaron's help after kissing him. There, she runs into Regina, and they have a heart-to-heart before making up.

Cady is elected Spring Fling Queen, but after noticing how fragile and cheap the plastic crown is, she breaks it into several pieces and gives them to each girl in attendance – telling them they are all "real, and rare." She apologizes to Janis and Damian, and they move forward as friends once more. Cady, Damian, Janis, Gretchen, Karen, Aaron, and Regina join together, finally accepting each other ("I See Stars").

Cast and characters
Original cast

 Notable Broadway cast replacements 

Cady Heron: Sabrina Carpenter
Regina George: Reneé Rapp
Gretchen Wieners: Krystina Alabado
Mrs. Heron/Ms. Norbury/Mrs. George: Jennifer Simard, Catherine Brunell

In addition, in January 2020, when Kyle Selig took a leave of absence, Cameron Dallas played the role of Aaron Samuels.

Musical numbers
Numbers:
Key:
 † Not included on Original Broadway Cast Recording
 †† Included as part of "Fearless" on Original Broadway Cast Recording
 ‡ Song cut in touring production and on Broadway in newer version 

Act 1
 "A Cautionary Tale" – Janis, Damian
 "It Roars" – Cady, Ensemble
 "It Roars (Reprise)"† – Cady, Ensemble
 "Where Do You Belong?" – Damian, Janis, Cady, Ensemble
 "Meet the Plastics" – Regina, Gretchen, Karen, Janis, Damian, Cady
 "Stupid with Love" – Cady
 "Apex Predator" – Janis, Cady, Ensemble
 "What’s Wrong with Me?" – Gretchen
 "Stupid with Love (Reprise)" – Aaron, Cady
 "Sexy" – Karen, Female Ensemble
 "Someone Gets Hurt" – Regina, Aaron, Male Ensemble
 "Revenge Party" – Janis, Damian, Cady, Company
 "Fearless" – Cady, Gretchen, Karen, Ensemble
 "Someone Gets Hurt" (Reprise 1)†† ‡ – Regina, Ensemble

Act 2
 "A Cautionary Tale (Reprise)"† – Janis, Damian
 "Stop" – Damian, Art Students, Karen, Ensemble
 "What's Wrong With Me? (Reprise)" – Gretchen, Mrs. George
 "Whose House Is This?" – Kevin G, Cady, Gretchen, Karen, Ensemble
 "More Is Better" – Cady, Aaron, Ensemble
 "Someone Gets Hurt (Reprise)" – Cady, Janis, Damian
 "World Burn" – Regina, Ensemble
 "I'd Rather Be Me" – Janis, Ensemble
 "Fearless (Reprise)"† – Cady
 "Do This Thing" – Cady, Ms. Norbury, Kevin G, Mathletes
 "I See Stars" – Cady, Company

Recording
The Original Broadway Cast recording was released digitally in the U.S. on May 18, 2018. The physical album was released in the U.S. on June 15, 2018. The album debuted at number 42 on the Billboard 200 chart, the highest debut for a cast album in over a year.

On December 7, 2018, "Rockin' Around the Pole", which does not appear on the cast recording but is featured in the musical, was released on digital music platforms. A music video for the holiday song was also released. On April 8, 2020, a live recording of "Bossed Up", a song that was included in the show's Washington, D.C. tryout but was ultimately cut from the Broadway production, was officially released to celebrate what would have been the show's two year anniversary on Broadway.

 Critical response 
Marilyn Stasio, in her review for Variety wrote: "Fey has front-loaded the show with great gags...Nell Benjamin’s lyrics aren’t half as clever as Fey’s off-the-cuff wisecracks, but they get the job done and are quirky enough to make you listen hard for the good stuff, providing enough payoff lyrics to reward your attention... Fans of the original movie should be reassured that nothing important has been purged from the story."

David Rooney, in his review for The Hollywood Reporter, wrote: "If the songs composed by Fey's husband Jeff Richmond with lyrics by Nell Benjamin more often fall into workmanlike pastiche than inspired musical storytelling, too seldom developing robust melodic hooks, the score at least wins points for democratization. Every one of the principals gets a musical moment that tells us who they are, both the protective outer shell developed to survive the savage jungle of high school, and the tender human core, yearning to connect... While the show's book outshines the score, the songs pack in their share of wit, both in Benjamin's nimble lyrics (recalling her work on the Legally Blonde musical) and Richmond's buoyant tunes, which borrow with a wink from a variety of styles."

Sara Holdren, reviewing in New York "Vulture" section wrote: "'Mean Girls' isn’t flawless. The first act is so strong, with such a well-built, fast-paced arc, that the second half feels like it takes a few tugs on the starter cord before the lawnmower fires up again. Some of the movie’s best jokes don’t fully land in their delivery...It’s not shocking that 'Mean Girls' is a fast-paced fancy fun time, but it’s a real treat to find that it’s still witty, worldly, and wise."The New York Times reviewer Ben Brantley wrote "The trouble lies in the less assured translation of Ms. Fey’s sly take on adolescent social angst into crowd-pleasing song and dance. Mr. Richmond and Ms. Benjamin’s many (many) musical numbers are passable by middle-of-the-road Broadway standards, yet they rarely capture either the tone or the time of being a certain age in a certain era... the show weighs in at two and a half hours, as opposed to the movie’s zippy 97 minutes." However, he ultimately stated he enjoyed parts of the performance, saying: "There’s a reason the show is called 'Mean Girls.' They're the next-door versions of those cosmetically perfect pop and movie stars whose public vanities and follies we savor with such glee. Ms. Fey is an ace student of this universal prurience. She's also smart enough to let us wallow in and renounce it at the same time."Entertainment Weekly's Kristen Baldwin gave the musical a B+, writing: "An ode to self-respect and the benefits of a STEM-based education, Broadway’s Mean Girls is a lively, frequently hilarious adaptation of Tina Fey’s 2004 high school comedy. Propelled by dazzling set design and several stand-out performances, the musical — written by Fey, with music by Jeff Richmond, and directed by Casey Nicholaw (The Book of Mormon'') — gives fans everything they want while bringing the saga of Regina George and the Plastics into the social media age."

Awards and nominations

Original Washington, D.C. production (2017)

Original Broadway production (2018)

References

External links
Internet Broadway Database
 

2017 musicals
Broadway musicals
Musicals based on films
Teen musicals
Mean Girls (franchise)
Plays set in the 21st century
Works impacted by the COVID-19 pandemic